Nicolette Stasko (born 1950) is a contemporary Australian poet, novelist and non-fiction writer of United States origin.

Nicolette Stasko was born in Johnstown, Pennsylvania, to Polish and Hungarian parents. She completed a BA with honours in English at Pennsylvania State University and an MA in education at Lehigh University then taught in special education. Marrying an Australian in 1978 she travelled in Europe and Asia settling in Perth, Western Australia where she taught at Perth Modern School. She separated from her husband, meeting the writer David Brooks with whom she has a daughter. In 1986 they moved to Brisbane where she taught and edited The Phoenix Review. During this period she began writing in earnest and had her first poetry published in Australia in the journal Hecate.

Stasko's first collection of poems, Abundance (1992), won the 1993 Anne Elder Award and she has since published several collections to widespread critical acclaim. She has also published a non-fiction book entitled Oyster: From Montparnasse to Greenwell Point (2000) and most recently the novel The Invention of Everyday Life (2007).

Bibliography 
Poetry
 Abundance. (Angus & Robertson, 1992) 
 Black Night with Windows. (Angus & Robertson, 1994) 
 Dwelling in the Shape of Things. (1999)
 In Certain Light. (2001)
 The Weight of Irises. (Black Pepper, 2003)  Excerpt
 Glass Cathedrals: New and Selected Poems. (Salt, 2006)  Excerpt

Novels
 The Invention of Everyday Life. (Black Pepper, 2007)  Excerpt

Non-fiction
 Oyster: From Montparnasse to Greenwell Point. (HarperCollins, 2000)   (paperback)

References

External links 
 6 poems at Thylazine

1950 births
Australian non-fiction writers
Australian poets
Pennsylvania State University alumni
Lehigh University alumni
Living people
Australian women novelists
Australian women poets